Luigi Pedrazzini may refer to:

 Luigi Pedrazzini (footballer) (1909 – ?), Italian footballer with Inter Milan, Atalanta and in Switzerland in the 1920s and 1930s
 Luigi Pedrazzini (politician) (b. 1953), Swiss politician, see :it:Luigi Pedrazzini and :de:Luigi Pedrazzini